Townburg, released in 2000, is the second album by the American rock band Virginia Coalition.

Track listing
 "Lonely Cowboy" - 3:17
 "E Song" - 3:55
 "Likeness" - 3:23
 "Atchafalaya" - 3:58
 "Luminiferous Ether" - 3:55
 "Wichita" - 1:05
 "Green and Grey" - 4:21
 "Mista Banks" - 4:49
 "A Song" - 3:07
 "Go-Go Tech" - 2:00
 "Wichita Reprise" -

Personnel
Virginia Coalition
Steve Dawson - vocals, guitar
Jarret Nicolay - bass, keyboard, guitar, vocals
Paul Ottinger - bass, keyboard, guitar, percussion
John Patrick - drums
Andrew Poliakoff - vocals, guitar, washboard, percussion

Recorded at The Fidelitorium

www.fidelitorium.com

Produced
Ted Comerford

Mixed
Mitch Easter

With guests:
Eddie from Ohio's Julie Murphy Wells - Female vocals on Wichita 
Tony LaSasso - Ozark Harp on Wichita Reprise
Mitch Easter - Guitar Solo on A Song
Stephen Hawking - vocal interlude on Go-Go Tech

References

2000 albums
Virginia Coalition albums